Ernest W. Gibson III (September 23, 1927 – May 17, 2020) was an attorney and judge who served as an associate justice of the Vermont Supreme Court.

Early life
Ernest Willard Gibson III was born in Brattleboro, Vermont on September 23, 1927, the son of Ernest W. Gibson Jr. and Dorothy P. (Switzer) Gibson.  Ernest Gibson Jr. served as Governor of Vermont and a judge of the United States District Court for the District of Vermont.  The grandfather of Ernest Gibson III, Ernest Willard Gibson, was a member of the United States House of Representatives and a United States senator.

Start of career
Gibson graduated from Washington, DC's Western High School in 1945.  He served in the United States Army at the end of World War II (1945 to 1946), and attained the rank of technical sergeant.  He received his bachelor's degree from Yale University in 1951, and served in the Army again during the Korean War, this time as a captain of field artillery in the 45th Infantry Division, for which he received the Bronze Star Medal.  Gibson received his law degree from Harvard Law School in 1956, and was admitted to the bar the same year.  Gibson continued his military career as a member of the Vermont Army National Guard, and attained the rank of major in the Judge Advocate General branch before retiring in 1971.

Political career
A Republican, he served as state's attorney for Windham County from 1957 to 1961.  He was elected to the Vermont House of Representatives in 1960 and 1962.  Gibson served one full term and part of another, 1961 to 1963, and he was appointed chairman of the Judiciary Committee in 1963.  In the House, Gibson joined a group known as the "Young Turks", members who worked for the passage of progressive legislation regardless of party affiliation; the Young Turks were instrumental in ending the Republican Party's 100-year grip on statewide power by electing Philip H. Hoff as governor in 1962.

Gibson was Chairman of the Vermont Public Service Board from 1963 to 1972.

Judicial career
In 1972, Gibson was appointed a judge of the Vermont Superior Court, and he served until 1983.

In 1983, Justice Franklin S. Billings Jr. of the Vermont Supreme Court was appointed as chief justice.  Gibson was nominated to replace Billings as an Associate Justice, and took office on February 11, 1983. He served on the court until retiring on July 31, 1997.

Controversy

In 1986 and 1987, Gibson and two other justices, William C. Hill and Thomas L. Hayes, were accused of misconduct, alleged to have tailored decisions to suit the wishes of an assistant judge in Chittenden County, and to have helped her cover up padding her pay; the assistant judge, Jane Wheel, was supposed to be wielding undue influence over the justices.  Hill retired, and Hayes died before the charges could be resolved.  (Wheel was convicted on charges arising from the case; Hill was found to have violated rules regarding judicial conduct.)  Gibson was overwhelmingly reappointed to the Supreme Court in March 1987, and in July 1987, Vermont's Judicial Conduct Board dropped the charges against him.

Later career
In January 1997, Gibson administered the oath of office to Howard Dean, who had been reelected as governor in 1996.  Gibson served until reaching the mandatory retirement age of 70, and was succeeded by Marilyn Skoglund.

Personal life
Gibson was Chancellor of the Episcopal Diocese of Vermont from 1977 to 1998 and President of the Board of Trustees of the Diocese from 1991 to 1998. In 1960 he married Charlotte Elaine Hungerford. They were the parents of three children: Margaret, Mary, and John. He died in Northfield, Vermont on May 17, 2020, and was buried at Morningside Cemetery in Brattleboro.

References

Sources

Internet

Newspapers

Books

Magazines

1927 births
2020 deaths
United States Army Field Artillery Branch personnel
Military personnel from Vermont
Vermont lawyers
State's attorneys in Vermont
Vermont state court judges
Justices of the Vermont Supreme Court
Yale University alumni
Harvard Law School alumni
People from Brattleboro, Vermont
People from Montpelier, Vermont
United States Army personnel of World War II
United States Army personnel of the Korean War
United States Army officers
Vermont National Guard personnel
Republican Party members of the Vermont House of Representatives